Simeon of Jerusalem was a Jewish Christian leader and according to most Christian traditions the second Bishop of Jerusalem (63 or 70–107 or 117), succeeding James, brother of Jesus. Simeon is sometimes identified with Simon, brother of Jesus, and has also been identified with the Apostle Simon the Zealot.

Life
In his Church History Eusebius of Caesarea gives the list of these bishops. According to tradition the first bishop of Jerusalem was James the Just, the "brother of the Lord", who according to Eusebius said that he was appointed bishop by the apostles Peter, James (whom Eusebius identifies with James, son of Zebedee), and John.

According to Eusebius, Simeon of Jerusalem was selected as James' successor after the conquest of Jerusalem which took place immediately after the martyrdom of James (i.e. no earlier than 70 AD) which puts the account in agreement with that of Flavius Josephus, who puts James' first arrest and subsequent release by Procurator Lucceius Albinus in 63 AD and the modern footnotes show that his martyrdom took place some years afterwards, shortly before the destruction of Jerusalem.

According to Hegesippus, Simeon prevailed against Thebutis, whom the church fathers deemed a heresiarch, and led most of the Christians to Pella before the outbreak of the First Jewish–Roman War in 66 and the destruction of Herod's Temple in 70.

According to Eusebius, Simeon was executed about the year 107 or 117 under the reign of emperor Trajan by the proconsul  Tiberius Claudius Atticus Herodes in Jerusalem or the vicinity. However, this must be a mistake by Eusebius because the administrator (Legate) of the Roman province of Judea at the time of the crucifixion was Quintus Pompeius Falco (between 105 and 107 AD) and Tiberius Claudius Atticus Herodes was there much earlier, from 99 to 102 AD.

Identifications
Simeon is sometimes identified with Simon, the "brother of the Lord", who is mentioned in passing in the Bible (Matthew 13:55, Mark 6:3) and pointing to Hegesippus referring to him as the second bishop of Jerusalem and as a cousin of Jesus. Other exegetes consider the brothers to be actual brothers and Hegesippus' wording as subsuming both James and Simeon under a more general term.

He has also been identified with the Apostle Simon the Zealot.

See also
 Saint Simeon of Jerusalem, patron saint archive

References

Year of birth unknown
100s deaths
1st-century bishops of Jerusalem
2nd-century bishops of Jerusalem
2nd-century Christian martyrs
2nd-century executions
People executed by crucifixion
People executed by the Roman Empire
People in Acts of the Apostles
Saints from the Holy Land